Keyport is a borough in Monmouth County, in the U.S. state of New Jersey. At the 2010 United States Census, the borough's population was 7,240, following a decline of 328 (−4.3%) from the 7,568 counted in the 2000 Census, which had in turn declined by 18 (−0.2%) from the 7,586 counted in the 1990 Census. Keyport's nickname is the "Pearl of the Bayshore" or the "Gateway to the Bayshore".

Keyport was originally formed as a Town on March 17, 1870, from portions of Raritan Township (now Hazlet). On April 2, 1908, the Borough of Keyport was formed, replacing Keyport Town.

Keyport is part of the Bayshore Regional Strategic Plan, an effort by nine municipalities in northern Monmouth County to reinvigorate the area's economy by emphasizing the traditional downtowns, dense residential neighborhoods, maritime history, and the natural Raritan Bayshore coastline.

Geography

According to the United States Census Bureau, the borough had a total area of 1.46 square miles (3.77 km2), including 1.38 square miles (3.58 km2) of land and 0.07 square miles (0.19 km2) of water (5.07%).

The borough borders the boroughs of Keansburg (via a maritime boundary) and Union Beach, and the townships of Aberdeen and Hazlet to the northeast, southwest and southeast respectively.

Demographics

2010 census

The Census Bureau's 2006–2010 American Community Survey showed that (in 2010 inflation-adjusted dollars) median household income was $56,509 (with a margin of error of +/− $7,915) and the median family income was $82,714 (+/− $13,757). Males had a median income of $56,156 (+/− $6,693) versus $41,782 (+/− $4,326) for females. The per capita income for the borough was $28,545 (+/− $2,210). About 4.9% of families and 9.5% of the population were below the poverty line, including 14.6% of those under age 18 and 8.0% of those age 65 or over.

2000 census
At the 2000 United States census, there were 7,568 people, 3,264 households and 1,798 families residing in the borough. The population density was 5,358.4 per square mile (2,072.4/km2). There were 3,400 housing units at an average density of 2,407.3 per square mile (931.0/km2). The racial makeup of the borough was 85.2% White, 7.0% African American, 0.12% Native American, 2.22% Asian, 0.04% Pacific Islander, 2.96% from other races, and 2.46% from two or more races. Hispanic or Latino of any race were 11.09% of the population.

There were 3,264 households, of which 25.8% had children under the age of 18 living with them, 39.4% were married couples living together, 10.9% had a female householder with no husband present, and 44.9% were non-families. 38.4% of all households were made up of individuals, and 19.5% had someone living alone who was 65 years of age or older. The average household size was 2.31 and the average family size was 3.11.

21.8% of the population were under the age of 18, 7.3% from 18 to 24, 33.2% from 25 to 44, 21.6% from 45 to 64, and 16.1% who were 65 years of age or older. The median age was 38 years. For every 100 females there were 93.1 males. For every 100 females age 18 and over, there were 90.8 males.

The median household income was $43,869 and the median family income was $58,176. Males had a median income of $40,324 compared with $34,036 for females. The per capita income for the borough was $23,288. About 4.9% of families and 7.8% of the population were below the poverty line, including 4.7% of those under age 18 and 9.0% of those age 65 or over.

Economy

Keyport is known for its oyster industry, which had been one of the world's largest suppliers until overfishing and pollution led to a collapse of the industry in the early to mid 20th century. In August 2010, NY/NJ Baykeeper suspended an effort to recreate the oyster reefs in Keyport's Raritan Bay after the New Jersey Department of Environmental Protection cited concerns that the oysters could be harvested and sold to the public despite the persistent heavy pollution in the water after concerns had been raised by the United States Food and Drug Administration that patrols were insufficient to ensure that the oysters in the reef were not being harvested.

It was the home of the Aeromarine Plane and Motor Company which operated from 1914 to 1930 and built seaplanes for the United States Navy during World War I. Its planes were mostly military seaplanes and flying boats, including aircraft that offered some of the first scheduled air service using seaplanes.

Keyport has been credited as the birthplace of the "Lazy Susan", designed by William Bedle in 1845. However this is highly disputed since there were earlier dated pieces found in China and England. It was the site of the professional dance debut of film star Fred Astaire in 1903 at age four, together with his sister Adele, as part of an act that earned a review that called the duo "the greatest child act in vaudeville.

Business district
Keyport is home to many diverse businesses, and has a bustling shopping district located on West Front Street, located one block in from the waterfront. The business district is now under control of the Keyport Bayfront Business Cooperative (which was established in 2011 to replace the now-defunct Keyport Business Alliance) which helps to organize events that benefit the businesses in Keyport as well as the city as a whole.

Keyport is home to Espresso Joe's, a coffee shop and venue for local musical and artistic acts. Celebrity Chef Bobby Flay filmed a segment for CBS Sunday Morning at the Broad Street Diner, which has won numerous awards and accolades.

Government

Local government 
Keyport is governed under the Borough form of New Jersey municipal government, which is used in 218 municipalities (of the 564) statewide, making it the most common form of government in New Jersey. The governing body is comprised of the Mayor and the Borough Council, with all positions elected at-large on a partisan basis as part of the November general election. A Mayor is elected directly by the voters to a four-year term of office. The Borough Council is comprised of six members elected to serve three-year terms on a staggered basis, with two seats coming up for election each year in a three-year cycle. The Borough form of government used by Keyport is a "weak mayor / strong council" government in which council members act as the legislative body with the mayor presiding at meetings and voting only in the event of a tie. The mayor can veto ordinances subject to an override by a two-thirds majority vote of the council.

, the Mayor of Keyport is Republican Rose P. Araneo, whose term of office ends December 31, 2026. Borough Council members are Council President Lori Ann Davidson (R, 2023), J. Christopher Demarest (R, 2024; appointed to serve an unexpired term), Kathleen McNamara (D, 2023), Ron G. Peperoni Jr. (R, 2024), Cathleen Reilly (R, 2025) and Melissa Vecchio (R, 2025).

J. Christopher Demarest was selected by the Borough Council in January 2023 from a list of three  residents nominated by the Republican municipal committee to temporarily fill the seat expiring in December 2024 that became vacant when Rose P. Araneo took office as mayor; Demarest will serve on an interim basis until the November 2023 general election, when voters will choose a candidate to serve the balance of the term of office.

On Election Day, November 7, 2007, Council President Robert Bergen was elected Mayor, taking the seat of two-term incumbent John J. Merla who plead guilty to federal corruption charges on January 18, 2007, for accepting bribes to obtain municipal contracts. Bergen assumed the post of Mayor on January 1, 2007.

Federal, state and county representation 
Keyport is located in the 6th Congressional District and is part of New Jersey's 13th state legislative district.

 

Monmouth County is governed by a Board of County Commissioners comprised of five members who are elected at-large to serve three year terms of office on a staggered basis, with either one or two seats up for election each year as part of the November general election. At an annual reorganization meeting held in the beginning of January, the board selects one of its members to serve as Director and another as Deputy Director. , Monmouth County's Commissioners are
Commissioner Director Thomas A. Arnone (R, Neptune City, term as commissioner and as director ends December 31, 2022), 
Commissioner Deputy Director Susan M. Kiley (R, Hazlet Township, term as commissioner ends December 31, 2024; term as deputy commissioner director ends 2022),
Lillian G. Burry (R, Colts Neck Township, 2023),
Nick DiRocco (R, Wall Township, 2022), and 
Ross F. Licitra (R, Marlboro Township, 2023). 
Constitutional officers elected on a countywide basis are
County clerk Christine Giordano Hanlon (R, 2025; Ocean Township), 
Sheriff Shaun Golden (R, 2022; Howell Township) and 
Surrogate Rosemarie D. Peters (R, 2026; Middletown Township).

Politics
On March 23, 2011, there were a total of 4,442 registered voters in Keyport, of which 1,251 (28.2%) were registered as Democrats, 950 (21.4%) were registered as Republicans and 2,240 (50.4%) were registered as Unaffiliated. There was one voter registered to another party.

In the 2012 presidential election, Democrat Barack Obama received 56.6% of the vote (1,664 cast), ahead of Republican Mitt Romney with 42.0% (1,234 votes), and other candidates with 1.4% (42 votes), among the 2,970 ballots cast by the borough's 4,600 registered voters (30 ballots were spoiled), for a turnout of 64.6%. In the 2008 presidential election, Democrat Barack Obama received 52.1% of the vote (1,759 cast), ahead of Republican John McCain with 44.6% (1,506 votes) and other candidates with 1.7% (56 votes), among the 3,374 ballots cast by the borough's 4,704 registered voters, for a turnout of 71.7%. In the 2004 presidential election, Republican George W. Bush received 50.0% of the vote (1,649 ballots cast), outpolling Democrat John Kerry with 48.4% (1,596 votes) and other candidates with 0.8% (35 votes), among the 3,297 ballots cast by the borough's 4,620 registered voters, for a turnout percentage of 71.4.

In the 2013 gubernatorial election, Republican Chris Christie received 67.1% of the vote (1,316 cast), ahead of Democrat Barbara Buono with 30.6% (600 votes), and other candidates with 2.3% (45 votes), among the 2,005 ballots cast by the borough's 4,547 registered voters (44 ballots were spoiled), for a turnout of 44.1%. In the 2009 gubernatorial election, Republican Chris Christie received 55.2% of the vote (1,284 ballots cast), ahead of  Democrat Jon Corzine with 34.3% (796 votes), Independent Chris Daggett with 8.0% (185 votes) and other candidates with 1.2% (29 votes), among the 2,324 ballots cast by the borough's 4,544 registered voters, yielding a 51.1% turnout.

Education

The Keyport Public Schools serve students from pre-kindergarten through twelfth grade. As of the 2018–19 school year, the district, comprised of two schools, had an enrollment of 1,062 students and 104.0 classroom teachers (on an FTE basis), for a student–teacher ratio of 10.2:1. Schools in the district (with 2018–19 enrollment data from the National Center for Education Statistics) are 
Keyport Central School with 687 students in grades Pre-K–8 and 
Keyport High School with 364 students in grades 9–12.

Students in public school for ninth through twelfth grades from Union Beach attend the district's high school as part of a sending/receiving relationship with the Union Beach School System.

Transportation

Roads and highways

Route 35 and Route 36 both pass through in the southern section. The Garden State Parkway is just outside in both neighboring Aberdeen and Hazlet Townships at Exit 117.

Public transportation
NJ Transit offers local bus service on the 817 route. NJ Transit train service is available nearby at the Hazlet and Aberdeen-Matawan stations on the North Jersey Coast Line.

Notable people

People who were born in, residents of, or otherwise closely associated with Keyport include:

 Henry E. Ackerson Jr. (1880–1970), Justice of the New Jersey Supreme Court from 1948 to 1952
 Piotr Czech (born 1986), NFL placekicker
 John DeServio, bass player of Black Label Society
 John Earle (born 1968), retired football player who played in the CFL for the Baltimore Stallions before becoming a youth minister and evangelist
 Juanita Hall (1901–1968), actress best known for her role as "Bloody Mary" in the movie South Pacific
 Kenneth Hand (1899–1988), politician who served in the New Jersey Senate and judge on New Jersey Superior Court
 Garret Hobart (1844–1899), Vice President of the United States from 1897 to 1899, spent his boyhood years in Keyport at a home on Broad Street, which was destroyed in the Great Fire of September 21, 1877
 Moe Jaffe (1901–1972), songwriter and bandleader
 Pat Kennedy (born 1952), men's basketball coach at Pace University
 Amy Lamé (born 1971 as Amy Caddle), performer, writer, TV and radio presenter, known for her one-woman shows, her performance group Duckie, and LGBT-themed media works
 Sayra Fischer Lebenthal (1898–1994), Wall Street banker credited with introducing the idea of selling small lots of municipal bonds to individual investors
 Georg J. Lober (1892–1961), sculptor
 Horace M. Thorne (1918–1944), awarded the Medal of Honor for valor during World War II
 Raymond L. Wyckoff (1887–1939), politician, who served as Mayor of Keyport, member of the Monmouth County Board of Chosen Freeholders and as Monmouth County Clerk

References

External links

Borough of Keyport official website
Keyport Business Alliance
Eagle Hose Company #4
Keyport Fire Department
Keyport Public Schools

School Data for the Keyport Public Schools, National Center for Education Statistics
Keyport Historical Society
Green Grove Cemetery – Keyport, NJ

 
1908 establishments in New Jersey
Borough form of New Jersey government
Boroughs in Monmouth County, New Jersey
Populated places established in 1908
Raritan Bayshore